George Forbes was an Australian politician.

He was probably of private means and lived at Parramatta. From 1858 to 1861 he was a member of the New South Wales Legislative Council.

References

Year of birth unknown
Year of death missing
Members of the New South Wales Legislative Council